Ghosthouse or Ghost House may refer to:

Film
The Ghost House (film), a 1917 American silent film directed by William C. deMille
Ghosthouse (film)，1988 Italian film 
Ghost House (2004 film), South Korean horror-comedy film
Ghost House (2017 film), American film

Other uses
Ghost House (video game), 1986 video game
The Ghost House (audiobook), a 2008 novel by Stephen Cole, also published in The Sarah Jane Adventures Collection
Ghost House Pictures, American film production company
Ghosthouse, a house often perceived as being inhabited by disembodied spirits of the deceased, also known as a haunted house

See also

 
 
 Haunted house (disambiguation)